The Águas Livres Aqueduct ("Aqueduct of the Free Waters") is a historic aqueduct in the city of Lisbon, Portugal. It is one of the most remarkable examples of 18th-century Portuguese engineering. The main course of the aqueduct covers 18 km, but the whole network of canals extends through nearly 58 km.

The city of Lisbon has always suffered from lack of drinking water, and King John V decided to build an aqueduct to bring water from sources in the parish of Caneças, in the modern municipality of Odivelas. The project was paid for by a special sales tax on beef, olive oil, wine, and other products.

History

Background
Water was in scarce supply even for Lisbon's earliest inhabitants.  The Tagus estuary bordering their settlement was too brackish to be potable due to tidal influx of seawater.  The only area with reliable spring water was the Alfama neighborhood.  With the growth of the city outside of its medieval walls, pressures on its water supply grew.  The idea of using water from the Carenque river valley, near Belas, became attractive. This source was first used by the Romans, who built a dam and an aqueduct there.

In 1571, Francisco de Holanda proposed using the Roman system to supply Lisbon's water to Portuguese king D. Sebastião.  Some time later, in 1620, the proposal resurfaced to use the still viable Roman-era aqueducts, this time to D. Filipe II.  The king instituted a tax to fund construction.  The funds, however, were diverted to charity rather than to building work.

The continuing water problems attracted the attention of city administrators again in 1728, who levied a broader tax on certain foods products in order to raise aqueduct financing. A year later, in 1729, three men were appointed to prepare the construction plan for the system that would include the construction of a monumental section of the aqueduct over the Alcântara valley.

Construction
Construction started in 1731 under the direction of Italian architect Antonio Canevari, replaced in 1732 by a group of Portuguese architects and engineers, including Manuel da Maia, Azevedo Fortes and José da Silva Pais. Between 1733 and 1736, the project was directed by Manuel da Maia, who in turn was replaced by Custódio Vieira, who would remain at the head of the project until around 1747.

Custódio Vieira conceived the centerpiece of the aqueduct, the arches over the Alcantara valley, completed in 1744. A total of 35 arches cross the valley, covering 941 m. The tallest arches reach a height of 65 m, and many are pointed, reminiscent of arches in Gothic style. It is considered a masterpiece of engineering in the Baroque period.

In 1748, although the project was still unfinished, the aqueduct finally started to bring water to the city of Lisbon, a fact celebrated in a commemorative arch built in the Amoreiras neighbourhood. From this period on, construction was overseen by other architects, including Carlos Mardel of Hungary and others. During the reigns of José I and Maria I, the network of canals and fountains was greatly enlarged.

On November 1, 1755, the 1755 Lisbon earthquake hit the city, but the brand new aqueduct managed to remain intact.

Use
After delivering its first water in 1748, the aqueduct fed a whole new network of fountains built in the city simply by gravity. The system's capacity was continuously increased due to the growing water needs boosted by the city's growing population.  Work was mostly on the upstream end, to collect more water.  The system comprised, in total,  of under- and above-ground conduits and galleries.

From 1880 onwards, the importance of the aqueduct decreased considerably due to increased use of the Alviela watershed via the Alviela Aqueduct.  Steam pumps filled the Barbadinhos reservoir, that in turn fed Lisbon.  The aqueduct, however, remained operational until 1967 as a pipe run that transported water from other sources (the concrete pipe supports are still visible inside).  The piping was decommissioned in 1968.

It is possible to visit and cross the aqueduct, starting at the Museu da Água (Water Museum) site in Lisbon's Campolide neighbourhood.

Mãe d'Água
The Mãe d'Água (Mother of the Water) reservoir of the Amoreiras, the largest of the water reservoirs, was finished in 1834. This reservoir, with a capacity of 5,500 m³ of water, was designed by Carlos Mardel. It is now deactivated and can be visited as part of the Museu da Água (Water Museum).

References

Bibliography

External links

 The Water Museum
 Listing by Portuguese Institute for Architectural Heritage (SIPA)
 Listing by General Bureau for National Buildings and Monuments
 Virtual visit to the Water Museum
 The Water Museum

Infrastructure completed in 1748
Buildings and structures in Lisbon
Aqueducts in Portugal
Tourist attractions in Lisbon
National monuments in Lisbon District